Paraná, Paranã or Parana may refer to:

Geology 
Paraná Basin, a sedimentary basin in South America

Places

In Argentina
Paraná, Entre Ríos, a city
Paraná Department, a part of Entre Ríos Province
Paraná, Buenos Aires, a settlement in Escobar Partido, Buenos Aires

In Brazil

Paraná (state)
Paraná, Rio Grande do Norte, a town
Paraná Province, one of the provinces of the Empire of Brazil
Paranã, a city in the state of Tocantins
Ji-Paraná, a city in the state of Rondônia
Ji-Paraná, a football team from Ji-Paraná, Rondônia state

In India
Parana, Agra, a village in Uttar Pradesh, India

Rivers 
Paraná River, a river that flows through Brazil, Paraguay, and Argentina
Paraná Delta, at the mouth of Paraná River
Paranã River, a river in the state of Goiás, Brazil
Paraná Urariá, a river in the state of Amazonas, Brazil

Other 
ARA Paraná, several ships of the Argentine Navy
Paraná Clube, a football team in the Vila Capanema district of Curitiba, Paraná
Paraná (footballer), Brazilian association footballer
Parana pine, a common name of Araucaria angustifolia

See also 
Paran (disambiguation), places in Israel and Iran
Piranha, or pirañas, omnivorous freshwater fish living in South American rivers
Piranha (disambiguation)